4AM Mulholland is the second extended play (EP) by American R&B singer Amerie, released on October 19, 2018, through Feeniix Rising Entertainment. It was released along with its sister EP, After 4AM. The LPs have been called a "two-sided concept album draped in late-night vibes and musings on love".

Background and recording
Together, the two EPs are considered Amerie's first album in nine years. Amerie had complete creative control over the project, as she wrote, recorded, mixed and engineered the songs herself. She stated that along with being "creatively freeing", "Everything on the album was recorded from when I didn't know I was pregnant to eight, nine months [along]". Amerie also said that she "didn't want the album to be a smorgasbord of sound, it needs to have a vibe and that's why there's two projects".

Critical reception

Maura Johnston of Pitchfork said the EPs "fuse Amerie's thoughtful craft to R&B's current wave and reveal more pleasure with each listen". Johnston acclaimed Amerie's vocal range on the tracks "Curious" and "A Heart's for the Breaking", and summarized that "On first listen, the sprawl of sound takes center stage as it does on so much modern mood music. Listen closer, though, and Amerie's thoughtful songwriting, detailed production, and muscular voice—which, even when heavily filtered, has the same commanding presence that made her earlier singles leap from the speakers—add detail and shape."

Jeff Benjamin of Billboard wrote that the content of the EPs "pivots from her pop-leaning past hits into a deep dive of more subdued, cavernous R&B and trance-laced productions". Benjamin felt that "Curious" sets a "moody, mysterious tone", and called "A Heart's for the Breaking" a "snappy, trap-heavy cut".

Track listing

Singles
Curious
A Heart's for the Breaking

References

2018 EPs
Amerie albums
Neo soul EPs